Re:Ignition is a five-piece hard rock/alternative metal music group from Bay Area, San Francisco.

History
Formed in 2004, the band is composed of Skinlab members lead vocals/guitarist Steev Esquivel and guitarist Steve "Snake" Green. The band released their debut album Empty Heart, Loaded Gun, on November 21, 2006 via Corporate Punishment Records.

Metal Hammer UK described the band's music as "hard-hitting, driving rock tracks with a beefy weight behind them". 
Re:Ignition also featured in the magazine's "Top 100 bands to watch for in 2007" list.

Discography

References

External links
 Official website
 

American alternative metal musical groups
Musical groups from San Francisco
Hard rock musical groups from California
Musical groups established in 2004
Heavy metal musical groups from California